Sean Curry (born April 29, 1982) is an American former professional ice hockey defenseman. He has previously played in Europe for the Hamburg Freezers of the Deutsche Eishockey Liga during the 2010–11 season. The following season he moved to Sweden to play with Rögle BK in the HockeyAllsvenskan (2nd division).  Following his stint in Europe, Curry returned to the United States and spent two seasons playing for the Alaska Aces in the ECHL.  On September 25, 2014, Curry announced that he had retired from playing professionally.

Career statistics

References

External links

1982 births
Adirondack Phantoms players
Alaska Aces (ECHL) players
American men's ice hockey defensemen
Carolina Hurricanes draft picks
Florida Everblades players
Hamburg Freezers players
Ice hockey players from Minnesota
Living people
Lowell Lock Monsters players
Medicine Hat Tigers players
Philadelphia Phantoms players
Providence Bruins players
Rögle BK players
Toledo Walleye players
Tri-City Americans players
People from Burnsville, Minnesota